Robert J. Waldorf (August 29, 1918 – February 5, 1996) was an American football player and coach. He served as the head football coach at Simpson College in Indianola, Iowa from 1940 to 1941 and at Western Maryland College–now known as McDaniel College–from 1957 to 1964, compiling a career college football coaching record of 44–38–6. In between his stints at Simpson and Western Maryland, Waldorf coached in the high school football ranks, at Battle Creek Central High School in Battle Creek, Michigan from 1946 to 1952 and Washington-Lee High School in Arlington, Virginia from 1953 to 1956.

Waldorf played college football at the University of Missouri, where he was a member of the 1939 College Football All-America Team as a guard.

Head coaching record

College

References

External links
 

1918 births
1996 deaths
American football guards
Missouri Tigers football players
McDaniel Green Terror athletic directors
McDaniel Green Terror football coaches
Simpson Storm football coaches
High school football coaches in Michigan
High school football coaches in Virginia